Ourasphaira giraldae is an extinct process-bearing multicellular eukaryotic microorganism. Corentin Loron argues that it was an early fungus. It existed approximately a billion years ago during the time of the transition from the Mesoproterozoic to Neoproterozoic periods, and was unearthed in the Amundsen Basin in the Canadian Arctic. This fungus may have existed on land well before plants.

See also
 2019 in paleontology

References

Enigmatic fungus taxa
Fossil taxa described in 2019